The Cihak Farmstead is a historic farmstead located in Scotland, South Dakota. It was added  to the National Register of Historic Places on November 28, 1984, as part of a nomination of "German-Russian Folk Architecture Thematic Resources" in South Dakota. The farmstead was established by ethnic German immigrants from Russia.

See also
National Register of Historic Places listings in Bon Homme County, South Dakota

References

Houses in Bon Homme County, South Dakota
Farms on the National Register of Historic Places in South Dakota
German-Russian culture in South Dakota
Houses on the National Register of Historic Places in South Dakota
National Register of Historic Places in Bon Homme County, South Dakota
Scotland, South Dakota